In late June and late July 2019 there were two temporally distinct European heat waves, which set all-time high temperature records in Belgium, France, Germany, Luxembourg, the Netherlands, and the United Kingdom.

The first heat wave, in late June, killed over 567 people, and according to meteorologists it was caused by high pressure and winds from the Sahara Desert affecting large parts of the continent. It resulted in record-breaking temperatures for the month of June at many locations. A national all-time record high temperature of  occurred on 28 June in Vérargues.

The deaths of 868 people in France and one person in Belgium were reported, along with thousands of animals when ventilation systems in barns were overwhelmed. Due to high river water temperatures and sluggish flows, particularly in France and to some extent Germany, a number of thermal power stations that use once-through cooling and do not have cooling towers had to reduce output or shut down to avoid breaching environmental limits on river water temperature designed to protect aquatic life.

Meteorological history

The above-normal hot condition in June is caused by an anomalous long-lasting anticyclone in the upper troposphere, which advects warm air from the Sahel and Mediterranean region and enhances incoming solar radiation and surface turbulent fluxes. The anomalous anticyclone results from an unusually-intensified British-Baikal Corridor pattern and a synoptic Rossby wave breaking event over Europe. 

The July heat wave was caused by a strong omega block, consisting of hot, dry air from North Africa, trapped between cold storm systems. The high-pressure area of hot air, called Yvonne, stretched from the central Mediterranean to Scandinavia and was pinned between two low-pressure areas, one over western Russia and the other over the eastern Atlantic.

Fatalities 
Total excess deaths are estimated to be around 2,500 during the summer months in 2019. Most of these were indirectly caused and were observed in statistical modeling later that year. Based on individual country counts, that figure may be an under estimate. The Dutch government reported 400 excess deaths in the week of the June heat wave, a figure comparable to those recorded during the 2006 European heat wave. 

France estimated 1,435 additional deaths due to the heatwave. Public Health England reported 900 excess deaths from the heatwave. The Robert Koch institute reported 500 excess deaths in Berlin alone.
Belgium reported at least 716 excess deaths during the summer.

By country

Belgium 
Belgium recorded three consecutive days exceeding ; 25 June was the hottest day during this period, with many places exceeding  and other places nearly reaching .

During the period of hot weather, environmental officials warned of poor air quality levels, which would especially affect the young, elderly and people with respiratory illnesses. It also affects small countries that rely on tourism as their main source of income.

On the same day, passengers were evacuated from a Eurostar train that had broken down between Halle and Tubize, as many began to fall ill due to the extreme temperatures. On 25 July, the national record was broken again, reaching  in Begijnendijk (Flemish Brabant). One death was reported.

Czech Republic 
High temperatures also complicated rail transport in the Czech Republic.

Denmark 
On 22 July 2019 the DMI issued a warning for high temperatures possibly up to 35°C (95°F). 
On 24 July, the temperature reached 30.9°C (87.6°F) in Åbenrå, Svendborg and Nykøbing Falster. 
On 25 July the temperature reached 32.0°C (89.6°F) in Vordingborg & Holbæk. 
Temperatures for that day were forecasted up to 35°C (95°F), but due to afternoon thunderstorms the temperature only reached a maximum of 32.0°C (95°F).

Finland 
On the same day,  was recorded in Porvoo.

France 

France was one of the most affected countries from the heatwave, with much of the country exceeding  on 26 June. Météo France issued an Orange Alert for much of the country due to exceptionally hot temperatures, excluding coastal regions, e.g. Brittany and the northern part of Hauts-de-France. Four departments of France were put on Red Alert: Bouches-du-Rhône, Gard, Hérault and Vaucluse. Owing to building codes with old structures common across the country, numerous buildings in France lack air conditioning. 

The French Government acted more proactively for the heat wave in light of its failings during the 2003 European heat wave. 15,000 people died during that event in France. Approximately 4,000 schools closed nationwide. Authorities in Paris opened public cooling rooms. Parks and pools extended operation hours in multiple cities. Museums with air conditioning allowed free entry for all people.

A national all-time record of
 was recorded by a manned weather station in Vérargues on 28 June, verified by Météo France on 19 July.

Twelve other locations observed temperatures above the previous record high. Numerous records were broken along the Mediterranean coastline.

Five people died nationwide: four from drowning and one from heat stroke. Police noted an increase in instances of illegal fire hydrant openings. A six-year-old child was hospitalised in critical condition after being hit by a stream of water from an illegally opened hydrant. Hospitals reported a significant increase in cases of cramps, dehydration, dizziness, and heart conditions.

In July 2019, France experienced its second heat wave in less than a month, beating several regional and national temperature records. More than 50 French cities exceeded their previous high temperature records in this heat wave.

On 23 July 80 departments of France were included in an orange heat wave alert by Météo-France, and 20 departments were included in a red alert the next day.

Lille also saw a high of  the following day, above the record of  that had been set the previous year.

On 25 July, the chief architect of the Notre-Dame de Paris cathedral told media that he feared that the heat wave could cause the cathedral's vaulted ceilings, damaged in an April 2019 fire, to collapse. While he indicated the stone walls were still stable for the time being, he explained that the walls were still saturated with water sprayed by firefighters during the blaze, and rapid drying from the extreme temperatures could adversely affect the stability of the structure.

Two nuclear reactors in southwest France were shut down and the output of six reactors were curtailed to avoid breaching environmental limits on the temperature of the rivers they use for cooling water. This reduced French nuclear power generation by around 5.2 gigawatts at a time of increased electricity demand due to the use of cooling devices.

According to the French Ministry of Health, 567 were reported to have died during the June heat wave, and 868 people died as a result of the July heat wave.

Germany 
Most of Germany recorded temperatures exceeding  on 26 June as well as large parts of the country exceeding . Nationwide, the average temperature for all of June reached , marking the warmest June in 140 years of record-keeping.

Four people died from drowning nationwide.

This beat the record for the highest ever temperature recorded in Germany, following its previous record of  measured a day earlier.

At the end of the heat wave, on the evening of 26 July, a maximum purple alert for storms was issued for three districts (Landkreise) of the Land Baden-Württemberg, namely Freudenstadt, Böblingen and Calw.

Greenland 
The melting was forecast to peak on 1 August. For comparison, the entire melt season in 2012 caused  of ice loss. A record 56.5 percent of Greenland Ice Sheet was showing signs of melting on 31 July.

A wild fire which has been burning near Sisimiut since early July necessitated dispatching firefighters from Denmark, as the fire was endangering inhabited areas and had the potential to continue burning through the winter. Forest fires are exceedingly rare in Greenland.

Italy
By 28 June, Italian authorities placed 16 cities under high alert for dangerous temperatures. Civil security services distributed water to tourists visiting Rome.

A 72-year-old man died of heat stroke in the Milano Centrale railway station.

Luxembourg 
On 25 July, a red alert for extreme heat was put in place for the entire country by Meteolux.

The high heat and dry conditions caused several fires during the heat wave. On 24 July, a fire broke out near Schumannseck, and hay bales caught fire in a field. On 25 July, a bush fire occurred in Hamm, and a fire truck exploded when it became engulfed in flames whilst attending the scene.

Netherlands 
On 25 June, much of the inland areas of the Netherlands exceeded . The KNMI issued a code yellow warning for large parts of the country due to the heat, and RIVM also put National Heat Plans into force in areas issued under code yellow.

In July in the Netherlands, an orange alert was put in place for the entire country due to the extreme heat. The previous high temperature heat record , set in Warnsveld in 1944, was broken on 24 July in Eindhoven (North Brabant) where the temperature reached . The following day,  was measured in Gilze-Rijen (also North Brabant). The West Frisian Islands was the only region for which no weather alert had been issued but there was a heatwave for the first time ever on Vlieland and Terschelling since measurements started in 1996.

On 27 July, the KNMI ended the orange alert for South Holland, Zeeland, North Brabant and Limburg. The same day at 22:32 CEST they ended the orange alert for the whole country.

On 22 July, ProRail announced code red for traffic controllers, as extra alertness was necessary for disturbances on the tracks and other problems due to heat. On 25 July, NS cancelled services on the Schiphol–Antwerp high-speed railway between Amsterdam—Schiphol—Rotterdam, and the connection between Amsterdam—Eindhoven and Eindhoven—Heerlen. As trains were exposed to high temperatures, more maintenance was required and some were taken out of service. Units without air conditioning or openable windows were also taken out of service. This continued into the following day, except with four other routes made unavailable; Amsterdam—Alkmaar, Amsterdam—The Hague, Duivendrecht—Lelystad and Schiphol—Nijmegen.

Many farm animals died as a result of the high temperatures, mainly due to ventilation systems failing. Due to a power failure in a chicken barn in Neer, 4,000 chickens died. Hundreds of chickens also died whilst being transported to Poland on 24 July because of rising temperatures.

Nearly 400 extra people were reported to have died during the heatwave compared to a regular summer week.

Norway 
However, the Norwegian Meteorological Institute later did not approve the recording due to too much gravel and too high vegetation near the station. 

This is highest temperature ever recorded inside the Arctic Circle in Norway.

At Sømna-Kvaløyfjellet, a weather station on a coastal hill  ASL in Nordland in Northern Norway, the overnight low on 28 July did not go below , beating the previous national record for the warmest night of  recorded 6 degrees of latitude further south in Halden, south of Oslo, in July 1933.
The Norwegian Meteorological Institute said that it had recorded "tropical nights" in 20 locations in the south of the country, where temperatures stayed above  throughout the night.

Poland
Poland recorded high temperatures early in June, with much of the country exceeding  on 12 June. Poland has also exceeded its previous June record, recording  in Radzyń.

Spain
Albuquerque, Badajoz recorded  on 29 June.

At least two heat stroke deaths occurred in the country: a 93-year-old man in Valladolid and a 17-year-old boy in Córdoba.

A wildfire broke out in La Torre de l'Espanyol within the Province of Tarragona in Catalonia on 26 June. According to local authorities, the fire ignited from decomposing chicken feces exposed to prolonged sunlight. Strong winds caused the fire to expand, with the blaze covering  by 28 June. It was said to be the worst wildfire in Catalonia in 20 years. 

By 28 June more than 600 firefighters and six aircraft were deployed to combat the blaze. Dozens of people were displaced, including at least 30 in Flix. Near the village, more than 200 sheep, 2 horses, and a donkey 
died in the fire. One of Ascó's Nuclear Power Plant evacuation power lines was near the site the fire started, so it was subsequently switched off in an attempt to aid with the fire extinguishing tasks. The plant continued to operate normally throughout the days.

Sweden 
Sweden was only affected in the southern portion of the country. On 30 June Oskarshamn measured  the highest June temperature since 1970.

The Swedish Meteorological and Hydrological Institute issued a Class 1 heat warning for parts of the country, as well as a warning for potential water shortages in August in 15 counties. To prevent forest fires due to the heat and dry weather, fire bans were put in place in several locations in Sweden. A meteorologist at the institute stated that although above average, temperatures in the south of the country were not as extreme. Mainly, the reason for this was that July started with a cool spell in Northern Europe in between the two heat waves.

Switzerland
In Switzerland, heat records were broken for the month of June at nearly 30 locations across the country.

MeteoSwiss issued a Level 3 hazard due to high temperatures for much of the country, with large parts of Valais and Ticino under a Level 4 hazard, meaning high danger due to the exceptional heat.

United Kingdom 
On 29 June large parts of England, including the South and the Midlands, faced temperatures exceeding  with the highest temperature of  recorded at Heathrow Airport and RAF Northolt. The heatwave was rather short lived in the United Kingdom, with temperatures dropping to near normal the next day.

One child drowned in the River Irwell in Greater Manchester  after diving in to cool off during high temperatures.

On 23 July, Public Health England renewed a heat warning for the whole of the United Kingdom, urging people to "keep hydrated, find shade and take protection against the sun". On the same night, widespread thunderstorms affected the country, with BBC Weather reporting around 48,000 lightning strikes overnight.

On 25 July, the Met Office announced that the United Kingdom had its hottest July day on record, with a temperature of  recorded in Rainham Kent.

Impact on British transport and flights 
On 25 July, Network Rail began to impose speed restrictions across its network to reduce buckling rails, as track temperatures surpassed . Measures included painting railway tracks white to reduce the temperature of the steel, and cancelling services. East Midlands Trains, Southeastern and Greater Anglia advised passengers against all but essential travel.

Many heat-related incidents on the country's rail network caused widespread disruptions, especially affecting intercity services from London. Damage to overhead line equipment occurred in Peterborough, Handsworth and Camden, as well as a trackside grass fire caused by cables snapping near West Hampstead. Trains arriving and departing from Birmingham New Street and around the West Midlands were also disrupted. Passengers were advised not to start new journeys as the overheating of overhead cables rendered many services unable to run.

On 26 July, all but essential travel had been advised against, after the extreme heat and storms caused severe disruption to the rail network and airports. Thameslink ran reduced services, with half of its lines unavailable. East Midlands Trains services between Sheffield, Nottingham, Derby and London St Pancras were disrupted due to overhead wire damage from the heat of the previous day, and an emergency timetable was put in place. All Eurostar services to and from Paris were suspended for an "undetermined amount of time" due to an exploded cable, as well as delays lasting up to an hour on Brussels services. 

Several flights were cancelled and delayed from Heathrow, Gatwick and London City airports due to "extreme weather conditions across Europe". A spokesperson from Heathrow said that flights had been affected by overnight storms as a result of the heat.

Highest temperature per country 

• :  on 25 July in Begijnendijk.

• : 

• :  on 25 July in Vordingborg and Holbæk.

• :  on 28 July in Porvoo. 

• :  on 28 June in Vérargues. 

• :  on 25 July in Lingen. 

• :  on 25 July in Steinsel. 

• :
 on 25 July in Gilze-Rijen. 

• 
 on 27 July in Saltdal. 

• 
 on 26 July in Radzyń.

• 
 on 29 June in Badajoz.

• 
 on 26 July in Markusvinsa. 

• 
 on 26 June in Zürich. 

• 
 on 25 July at Cambridge University Botanic Garden.

Research 
As of 1 August, the World Meteorological Organisation considered July 2019 to be at least tied for the hottest month ever recorded, based on global average temperature. Previously, June 2019 was found to be the hottest June on record. This was confirmed on 5 August by EU Earth Observation Network, which found it  hotter than the previous record-holder, July 2016. 2019 on the whole was found to be on track for the new hottest year on record.

A study of the event, a collaboration between several European climatological organisations and institutes, was published on 2 August 2019. It found that the temperatures experienced during the heat wave would have been  lower had it not been for anthropogenic global warming, and that temperatures recorded in France and Netherlands would have occurred there on average less than once a millennium. According to the study's lead author, at the current pace of warming, such heatwaves will be another  stronger by 2050.

See also

2003 European heat wave
2006 European heat wave
2018 European heat wave
2022 European heat waves
2019 Siberia wildfires
List of weather records
List of heat waves in 2019
Climate change in Europe

References

External link

European
European heat waves
European heat waves
European heat waves
Heat waves in Europe
Heat waves
Heat waves in the United Kingdom
Climate change in Europe
Climate change in Germany
Climate change in the United Kingdom
Climate change in Norway
Climate change in the Netherlands
Climate change in Belgium